Gusztáv Kálniczky (1896 – 1964) was a Hungarian fencer. He competed in the individual and team foil events at the 1928 Summer Olympics.

References

External links
 

1896 births
1964 deaths
Hungarian male foil fencers
Olympic fencers of Hungary
Fencers at the 1928 Summer Olympics